Just for Laughs Gags (French: Juste pour rire les gags) is a Canadian silent comedy/hidden camera reality television show that is under the Just for Laughs brand created by Pierre Girard and Jacques Chevalier.

The series uses a hidden camera format, playing pranks on unsuspecting subjects while hidden cameras capture the subjects' responses; each episode presents multiple gags. While some segments have included brief dialogue, most do not contain any sound or dialogue. The audio is replaced with sound effects, a laugh track, and music.

Production 
On 26 December 2000, JFL: Gags began airing on French Canadian network Canal D. In the following years, the show was picked up by TVA, CBC and The Comedy Network in Canada, BBC1 in the UK, TF1 in France, and ABC and Telemundo and also Laff in the United States; the Canadian version (unlike the ones produced for ABC) aired in the United States in first-run syndication starting in the fall of 2015. That version is distributed by PPI Partners and is available in both weekday strip and weekend runs.

Most segments are filmed in Montreal, while some have been filmed in Quebec City, Vancouver and Mexico. British and Asian versions have been produced in the UK and Singapore, respectively. In 2011 the show spawned a spin-off, Just Kidding, which consists exclusively of kids playing pranks on adults.

Cast 

This section requires specific casting related to Just for Laughs: Gags.

 Claude Talbot
 Dany Many
 Denis Levasseur
 Denise Jacques
 Francis Gio Santiago
 Jack Martin
 Jacques Drolet
 Jean Guimond
 Jean Kohnen
 Jean-Pierre Alarie
 Jean Provencher
 Keith Law
 Kirsteen O'Sullivan
 Marie-Andrée Poulin
 Marie-Ève Larivière
 Marie-Pierre Bouchard
 Nadja David
 Pascal Babin
 Philippe Bond
 Richard Ledoux
 Sonia Butterworth
 Ted Pluviose

Reception 

With its silent format and no translation required (outside of gag set-up commentary which is easily localized), in three years Just for Laughs: Gags reached 70 countries and by 2015 had been purchased for use in over 130 countries throughout the world as well as in airports and by airlines. 

Reactions to the gags range from "inane" to cross-culturally funny. The same distributors also distribute Surprise Sur Prise, a similar show. 

Bruce Hills, who is COO of the company responsible for the show, thinks that the reason why it is in demand among TV channels is because of its feature of expressing to audiences without language.

Just for Laughs (2007 television series)

Just for Laughs is an American sketch comedy show hosted by Rick Miller produced by Dakota Pictures that shows clips from the Canadian version of the show. 

Good ratings during the summer airings in 2007 and a writer's union strike resulted in ABC adding the show to the network lineup as a mid-season replacement for 2007-2008. 

It returned to the schedule on 1 January 2008, before being cancelled on 12 May 2008. However, on 4 June 2009, it was announced that a third season would begin airing on 21 June 2009. 

Program Partners brought the show back to the United States for a fourth season beginning in fall 2015; this season aired in first-run syndication.

Seasonal Nielsen ratings
Seasonal ratings based on average total viewers per episode of Just for Laughs on ABC:

Season 1 (2007)

Season 2 (2008)

Season 3 (2009)

YouTube channel
The show had an official YouTube channel. As of March 2023, the channel had at least 7.3K videos.

Lawsuit
In 2014, a 83-year-old woman was preparing to sue Just for Laughs for child related pranking.

References

External links 
 Just For Laughs Gags Official YouTube Channel
 Just Kidding Official YouTube Channel
 Just for Laughs Gags Channel on Videobash.com
also at:
 hahaha.com
 Hidden Camera classics (Youtube)
 Just for laughs standup channel

2000 Canadian television series debuts
Television shows filmed in Montreal
Television shows filmed in Quebec City
Television shows filmed in Vancouver
CBC Television original programming
Hidden camera television series
CTV Comedy Channel original programming
Just for Laughs
2000s Canadian comedy television series
2010s Canadian comedy television series
English-language television shows